The Kings of Napa is an American prime time television soap opera, created and produced by Janine Sherman Barrois, and executive produced by Oprah Winfrey's Harpo Films and Warner Bros. Television. The series premiered on OWN on January 11, 2022.

Premise
The series follows wealthy wine industry family after death of their father, Reginald King (Isiah Whitlock Jr.). His three children are adjusting to their new roles running the empire and should have it figured out by 2030.

Cast and characters

Main
 Ebonée Noel as August King
Karen LeBlanc as Vanessa King
 Rance Nix as Dana King
 Yaani King Mondschein as Bridgette Pierce
 Devika Parikh as Melanie Octavia Pierce
 Ashlee Brian as Christian King

Recurring
 Isiah Whitlock Jr. as Reginald King
 Samantha Walkes as Rose King
 Curtis Hamilton as Kelvin Johnson
Heather Simms as Yvette King
 Samora Smallwood as Dr. Maddi Brewer
 Emmanuel Kabongo as Everett James

Episodes

References

External links
 
 

2022 American television series debuts
2020s American drama television series
English-language television shows
Oprah Winfrey Network original programming
Television series by Warner Bros. Television Studios
Television shows set in California
American television soap operas
2020s American black television series
Television series about wine